Rooman is a surname. Notable people with the surname include:

 Alban Rooman, Belgian sport shooter and Olympian
 Léo Rooman (1928–2019), Belgian field hockey player and Olympian

Surnames of Belgian origin